The Thericleidae are a family of grasshoppers within the order Orthoptera and superfamily Eumastacoidea. They have exceptionally stubby antennae even for the Caelifera, with most species have a characteristic "horse-headed" look in profile.

The family occurs in Africa, most members living in small trees and shrubs rather than forbs or grasses.

The type genus is Thericles Stål, 1875. They are obscure insects, not well known to the public, but nonetheless have a few common names, including "monkey grasshoppers", whether because of the head shape, or because they are very agile in leaping about among the twigs of the trees they inhabit, is not clear. They also are called "bush hoppers", a name they share with the closely related Euschmidtiidae.

Subfamilies and selected Genera
 Afromastacinae Descamps, 1977
 Afromastax Descamps, 1977
 Clerithes Bolívar, 1914
 Barythericleinae Descamps, 1977 (monotypic)
 Barythericles Descamps, 1977
 Chromothericleinae Descamps, 1977
 Acanthothericles Descamps, 1977
 Chromothericles Descamps, 1977
 Dimorphothericles Descamps, 1977
 Loxicephalinae Descamps, 1977 (monotypic)
 Loxicephala Descamps, 1977
 Plagiotriptinae Bolívar, 1914
 Phaulotypus Burr, 1899
 Plagiotriptus Karsch, 1889
 Socotrella (insect) Popov, 1957
 Thericleinae Burr, 1899
 Lophothericles Descamps, 1977
 Thericles Stål, 1875
 incertae sedis
 Smilethericles Baccetti, 1997

References

Orthoptera families
Caelifera